Marthe Rakine (November 20, 1904 – July 27, 1996) was a Canadian, later Swiss, painter who was born in the Russian Empire, and was one of Canada's best colourists.

Career 
Rakine was born in Moscow to a Swiss father and French mother from Provence. The family moved to Paris when she was young, and she began her studies at the École nationale supérieure des arts décoratifs in that city in 1926. She also took lessons at the Sorbonne and with Othon Friesz at the Académie de la Grande Chaumière in the mid-1930s. She married the painter Boris Rakine, with whom she lived outside of Paris and with whom she emigrated to Canada in 1948. She next enrolled at the Ontario College of Art, taking ceramics and studying there from 1949 to 1950. She exhibited widely in Canada and abroad, both in solo and in group shows. In 1952, Rakine was invited to participate in the Canadian section of the Pittsburgh International Exhibition. Another of her shows was at the Montreal Museum of Fine Arts in 1954: she exhibited her work along with Jean-Paul Jerome. Two of her paintings are in the National Gallery of Canada; and other examples of her work may be seen at the Art Gallery of Ontario, the Art Gallery of Hamilton, the Montreal Museum of Fine Arts, the Agnes Etherington Art Centre, and the Art Gallery of Northumberland.

Rakine and her husband left Canada in 1958, taking up residence in Lausanne.

About her work, she said:
"I think it is quite important that a painter paint with love."

References

External links
 Bibliography at the Roberts Gallery

1904 births
1996 deaths
Canadian women painters
Swiss women painters
20th-century Canadian painters
20th-century Canadian women artists
Emigrants from the Russian Empire to Canada
Artists from Moscow
OCAD University alumni
Canadian people of Swiss descent
Canadian people of French descent
Canadian emigrants to Switzerland
20th-century Swiss painters
Swiss people of French descent